The 2021 Big 12 Conference football season was the 26th season of the Big 12 Conference football and took place during the 2021 NCAA Division I FBS football season. The season began on September 4 with non-conference play. Conference play began on September 18, 2021. The entire schedule was released on February 11, 2021.

The 2021 season was the tenth season for the Big 12 since the early 2010s conference realignment brought the Big 12 membership to its current form.
     
The 2021 Big 12 Championship Game was played at AT&T Stadium in Arlington, Texas, on December 4, 2021.

Background

Previous season
In the 2020 season, Oklahoma defeated Iowa State 27–21 in the conference championship.

Six teams were invited to bowl games in the 2020 season, and the conference went 5–0 in those games, with the Texas Bowl between TCU and Arkansas being cancelled due to COVID-19 issues.

Preseason

Big 12 media days
The 2021 Big 12 media days were held on July 14–15 in Frisco, Texas. The teams and representatives in respective order were as follows:

 Big 12 Commissioner – Bob Bowlsby
 Baylor – Dave Aranda (HC), Connor Galvin (OL) & Terrel Bernard (LB)
 Iowa State – Matt Campbell (HC), Breece Hall (RB) & Greg Eisworth II (DB)
 Kansas – Lance Leipold (HC), Kwamie Lassiter II (WR) & Kenny Logan Jr. (S)
 Kansas State – Chris Klieman (HC), Skylar Thompson (QB) & Jahron McPherson (DB)
 Oklahoma – Lincoln Riley (HC), Jeremiah Hall (FB) & Nik Bonitto (LB)
 Oklahoma State – Mike Gundy (HC), Spencer Sanders (QB) & Malcolm Rodriguez (DE)
 TCU – Gary Patterson (HC), Max Duggan (QB) & Ochaun Mathis (DE)
 Texas – Steve Sarkisian (HC), Bijan Robinson (RB) & Keondre Coburn (DT)
 Texas Tech – Matt Wells (HC), Dawson Deaton (OL) & Riko Jeffers (LB)
 West Virginia – Neal Brown (HC), Leddie Brown (RB) & Dante Stills (DL)

Preseason poll
The preseason poll was released on July 8, 2021.

First place votes in 

Preseason Watch Lists

Preseason All-Conference teams
2021 Preseason All-Big 12

Offensive Player of the Year: Spencer Rattler,  QB, Oklahoma
Defensive Player of the Year: Mike Rose, LB, Iowa State
Newcomer of the Year: Eric Gray, RB, Oklahoma

Head coaches
There were two head coaching changes in the conference following the conclusion of the 2019 season. On January 2, 2021, Texas announced that head coach Tom Herman would be departing the team, and that he would be replaced by Alabama offensive coordinator Steve Sarkisian. In addition, on March 8, 2021, Kansas announced they had fired Les Miles. On March 11, Emmett Jones was named interim head coach. On April 30, Kansas announced that Lance Leipold, formerly head coach of the Buffalo Bulls, would take over the position.

Schedule

All times Central time.

† denotes Homecoming game

Regular season schedule

Week 1

Week 2

Week 3

Week 4

Week 5

Week 6

Week 7

Week 8

Week 9

Week 10

Week 11

Week 12

Week 13

Championship Game

Head to head matchups

Updated with the results of all regular season conference games.

Postseason

Bowl games

For the 2020–2025 bowl cycle, The Big-12 will have annually eight appearances in the following bowls: Sugar Bowl (unless they are selected for playoffs filled by a Big-12 team if champion is in the playoffs), First Responder Bowl, Liberty Bowl, Alamo Bowl, Guaranteed Rate Bowl, Cheez-It Bowl and Texas Bowl. The Big-12 teams will go to a New Year's Six bowl if a team finishes higher than the champions of Power Five conferences in the final College Football Playoff rankings. The Big-12 champion are also eligible for the College Football Playoff if they're among the top four teams in the final CFP ranking.

Rankings are from CFP rankings.  All times Central Time Zone. Big-12 teams shown in bold.

Big 12 vs other conferences

Records against other conferences

Regular Season

Post Season

Big 12 vs Power 5 matchups
This is a list of the Power Five conferences teams (ACC, Big Ten, Pac-12, Notre Dame, BYU and SEC).

Big 12 vs Group of Five matchups
The following games include Big 12 teams competing against teams from The American, C-USA, MAC, Mountain West or Sun Belt.

Big 12 vs FBS independents matchups
The following games include Big 12 teams competing against FBS Independents which include Army, Liberty, New Mexico State, UConn and UMass.

Big 12 vs FCS matchups
The Football Championship Subdivision comprises 13 conferences and two independent programs.

Rankings

Awards and honors

Player of the week honors

Big 12 Individual Awards
The following individuals received postseason honors as voted by the Big 12 Conference football coaches at the end of the season.

All-conference teams

The following players earned All-Big 12 honors. Any teams showing (_) following their name are indicating the number of All-Big 12 Conference Honors awarded to that university for 1st team and 2nd team respectively.

First Team

Second Team

(U) - Unanimous Selection

Honorable mentions
BAYLOR: Gerry Bohanon (QB), Dillon Doyle (LB), TJ Franklin (DL), Jacob Gall (OL, ONoY), Siaki Ika (DLoY), Cole Maxwell (DL), Christian Morgan
(DB), Xavier Newman-Johnson (OL), Ben Sims (TE), Abram Smith (OPoY), R.J. Sneed (WR), JT Woods (DB)
IOWA STATE: Trevor Downing (OLoY), Greg Eisworth II (DB), Beau Freyler (DFoY), Jake Hummel (LB), Anthony Johnson (DB), Will McDonald IV (DPoY),
Andrew Mevis (PK, STPoY), Zach Petersen (DL), Darrell Simmons (OL)
KANSAS: Earl Bostick Jr. (OL), Kwamie Lassiter II (WR), Kenny Logan Jr. (DPoY), Devin Neal (RB, OFoY), Mike Novitsky (OL, OLoY, ONoY), Rich Miller (DNoY)
KANSAS STATE: Felix Anudike-Uzomah (DPoY), Cooper Beebe (OLoY), Julius Brents (DB), Cody Fletcher (LB), Daniel Green (LB), Eli Huggins (DL), Noah Johnson (OL), Malik Knowles (WR, STPoY), Nate Matlack (DFoY), Jahron McPherson (DB), Josh Rivas (OL), Reggie Stubblefield (DB), Deuce Vaughn (OPoY), Russ Yeast (DNoY), Ty Zentner (P)
OKLAHOMA: Gabe Brkic (STPoY), Pat Fields (DB), Key Lawrence (DB, DNoY), Marvin Mims (WR), Chris Murray (OL), Tyrese Robinson (OL, OLoY), Drake Stoops (WR), Danny Stutsman (DFoY), Caleb Williams (QB, OFoY, OPoY), Michael Woods II (ONoY)
OKLAHOMA STATE: Tanner Brown (PK), Logan Carter (FB), Braden Cassity (TE), Danny Godlevske (OL), Blaine Green (OFoY), Devin Harper (LB), Tom Hutton (P, STPoY), Tyler Lacy (DL), Brock Martin (DLoY), Malcolm Rodriguez (DPoY), Josh Sills (OLoY), Jason Taylor II (DB), Jaylen Warren (RB, OPoY), Hunter Woodard (OL)
TCU: Taye Barber (WR), Derius Davis (STPoY), Obinna Eze (ONoY), TreVius Hodges-Tomlinson (DPoY), Dylan Horton (DL), Quentin Johnston (OPoY)
TEXAS: Cade Brewer (TE), Luke Brockermeyer (LB), Keondre Coburn (DL), Anthony Cook (DB), Cameron Dicker (PK, STPoY), B.J. Foster (DB), Byron Murphy II (DFoY), Ovie Oghoufo (DNoY), Moro Ojomo (DL), DeMarvion Overshown (LB), Bijan Robinson (OPoY), Keilan Robinson (ONoY)
TEXAS TECH: Josh Burger (OL), Dawson Deaton (OLoY), Jonathan Garibay (STPoY), Kaylon Geiger (ONoY), Jaylon Hutchings (DL), Riko Jeffers (LB), Travis Koontz (TE), Reggie Pearson Jr. (DB), T.J. Storment (OL), Dadrion Taylor-Demerson (DB), Rayshad Williams (DB, DNoY), Tyree Wilson (DL)
WEST VIRGINIA: Alonzo Addae (DB), Leddie Brown (RB), Josh Chandler-Semedo (LB), Zach Frazier (OLoY), Bryce Ford-Wheaton (WR), James Gmiter (OL), Casey Legg (PK, STPoY), Sean Mahone (DB), Akheem Mesidor (DL), Wyatt Milum (OL, OFoY), Dante Stills (DLoY), Tyler Sumpter (P), Winston Wright Jr. (KR/PR, WR)

All-Americans

Currently, the NCAA compiles consensus all-America teams in the sports of Division I-FBS football and Division I men's basketball using a point system computed from All-America teams named by coaches associations or media sources.  The system consists of three points for a first-team honor, two points for second-team honor, and one point for third-team honor. Honorable mention and fourth team or lower recognitions are not accorded any points. College Football All-American consensus teams are compiled by position and the player accumulating the most points at each position is named first team consensus all-American. Currently, the NCAA recognizes All-Americans selected by the AP, AFCA, FWAA, TSN, and the WCFF to determine Consensus and Unanimous All-Americans. Any player named to the First Team by all five of the NCAA-recognized selectors is deemed a Unanimous All-American.

*AFCA All-America Team (AFCA)
*Walter Camp All-America Team
*AP All-America teams
*Sporting News All-America Team
*Football Writers Association of America All-America Team (FWAA)
*Sports Illustrated All-America Team
*Report All-America Team (BR)
*College Football News All-America Team (CFN)
*ESPN All-America Team
*CBS Sports All-America Team
*Athlon Sports All-America Team (Athlon)
*The Athletic All-America Team
*USA Today All-America Team

All-Academic
First team

Second team

Honorable mentions
BAYLOR: 
IOWA STATE: 
KANSAS: 
KANSAS STATE: 
OKLAHOMA: 
OKLAHOMA STATE: 
TCU: 
TEXAS: 
TEXAS TECH:
WEST VIRGINIA:

National award winners
2021 College Football Award Winners-->

Home game attendance

Bold – exceeded capacity
† Season high
‡ Record stadium Attendance

NFL Draft
The following list includes all Big 12 Players who were drafted in the 2022 NFL Draft

References

2021 Big 12 Conference football season